Omowunmi "Wunmi" A. Sadik (born 19 June 1964) is a Nigerian professor, chemist, and inventor working at Binghamton University. She has developed microelectrode biosensors for detection of drugs and explosives and is working on the development of technologies for recycling metal ions from waste, for use in environmental and industrial applications. In 2012, Sadik co-founded the non-profit Sustainable Nanotechnology Organization.

Early life and education
Sadik was born in 1964 in Lagos, Nigeria. Her family included a number of scientists, who supported her interests in physics, chemistry, and biology. She received her bachelor's degree in chemistry from the University of Lagos in 1985, and went on to receive her master's degree in chemistry in 1987. Sadik then attended Wollongong University in Australia. In 1994, she received her Ph.D. degree in chemistry from Wollongong.

Career
A postdoctoral fellowship from the National Research Council supported her as a researcher at the U.S. Environmental Protection Agency from 1994 to 1996. She then accepted a position as an assistant professor of chemistry at the Binghamton University in Binghamton, New York. She was promoted to associate professor in 2002, and full professor in 2005. At that time, she also became director of the Center for Advanced Sensors & Environmental Systems (CASE) at Binghamton. She has been visiting faculty at the Naval Research Laboratories, Cornell University, and Harvard University.

Sadik studies surface chemistry, with particular emphasis on the development of biosensors for use in environmental chemistry. She has found that conducting polymers are especially promising for use in sensing applications.  She has developed microelectrode biosensors sensitive to trace amounts of organic materials, technology which can be used for drug and bomb detection. She is also studying detoxification mechanisms of wastes such as organochlorine compounds in the environment, with the purpose of developing technologies for recycling metal ions from industrial and environmental waste. In one project, microbial enzymes increased the conversion of highly toxic chromium (VI) to non-toxic chromium (III) from 40% to 98%. Sadik is credited with more than 135 peer-reviewed research papers and patent applications. She holds U.S. patents  on particular types of bichair oors. In 2011, she was the chairperson of the inaugural Gordon Conference on Environmental Nanotechnology. In 2012, Sadik and Barbara Karn co-founded the Sustainable Nanotechnology Organization, a non-profit, international professional society for the responsible use of nanotechnology worldwide.

Sadik is an elected fellow of the Royal Society of Chemistry (2010) and of the American Institute for Medical and Biological Engineering (elected 2012). She is also a member of the American Chemical Society.  She is involved with the Environmental Protection Agency and the National Science Foundation, and was part of the National Institutes of Health Study Panel on Instrumentation and Systems Development. She is involved in international collaborations with the UNESCO International Center of Biodynamics in Bucharest, Romania, Ege University in Turkey, and the University of Fukui in Japan.

Awards

 2000, National Research Council (NRC) COBASE fellowship
 2001, Chancellor's Award for Research in Science and Medicine, SUNY
 2002, Chancellor's Award for Premier Inventors, SUNY
 2003–2004, Distinguished Radcliffe Fellowship from Harvard University
 2005–2006, NSF Discovery Corps Senior Fellowship
 2016, Nigerian National Order of Merit Award (NNOM)
 2017, Jefferson Science Fellow
 Australian Merit Award

References

1964 births
Living people
People from Lagos
University of Lagos alumni
University of Wollongong alumni
Nigerian chemists
Fellows of the African Academy of Sciences
Fellows of the Royal Society of Chemistry
Nigerian women scientists
21st-century American women scientists
Nigerian women chemists
Binghamton University faculty
Yoruba women academics
Nigerian women academics
Yoruba women scientists
Nigerian inventors
American people of Yoruba descent
State University of New York faculty
Nigerian emigrants to the United States
Radcliffe fellows
American women academics
Women inventors
21st-century American scientists
Fellows of the American Institute for Medical and Biological Engineering
21st-century American inventors
Scientists from New York (state)
Scientists from Lagos
Residents of Lagos